Kavash may refer to:

 Gevaş, a district of Turkey
 Khash, Iran, a city in Iran